Varalotti is a village of the Virudhunagar district in Tamil Nadu, India. Nearby railway station of Varalotti is Virudhunagar.

Villages in Virudhunagar district